Anteos clorinde, the white angled-sulphur, is a butterfly of the family Pieridae. The species was originally described by Jean-Baptiste Godart in 1824.

Range
It is found in South America, Central America, and southern North America.

The wingspan is 70–90 mm. The butterfly flies year round in the tropical parts of its range and from August to December in the north.

The larvae feed on Senna spectabilis.

Subspecies
The following subspecies are recognised:
Anteos clorinde clorinde (Godart, 1824)
Anteos clorinde nivifera (Frushstorfer, 1908) in Mexico

External links
 Butterflies and Moths of North America
 Pieridae Holarcticae

Coliadinae
Butterflies of North America
Butterflies of Central America
Butterflies of the Caribbean
Pieridae of South America
Butterflies of Cuba
Butterflies of Jamaica
Butterflies described in 1824
Taxa named by Jean-Baptiste Godart